Diane Rose Stratas (born 28 December 1932) is a Canadian former politician and businesswoman. She was a Progressive Conservative member of the House of Commons of Canada from 1979 to 1980.

Background
Stratas was a businesswoman and community service volunteer by career. She was the middle daughter of immigrants from a village named Kastri om Greece who lived in Saskatoon, Saskatchewan.  She was married to retired veterinarian, William J. Stratas, who died in 2013. In December 2009, her second son, David Stratas, was appointed a judge of the Federal Court of Appeal, based in Ottawa.

Politics
Stratas represented the newly formed Ontario constituency of Scarborough Centre, which she won by a comfortable margin in the 1979 federal election. In September 1979, she was appointed as Parliamentary Secretary to the Secretary of State, David MacDonald.

After serving one term, the 31st Canadian Parliament, she was defeated in the 1980 federal election by Norm Kelly of the Liberal Party. Following this defeat, she was elected national secretary of the Progressive Conservative Party of Canada. She did not run for federal office in the 1984 federal election but instead supported the candidacy of Pauline Browes. Stratas was the first woman of Greek-Canadian heritage elected to Canada's House of Commons. She also was one of only two female MPs in the Progressive Conservative government of 1979–1980, the other being Secretary of State for External Affairs, the Hon. Flora MacDonald.

After politics
In 1987, she was appointed to the national Refugee Status Advisory Committee but resigned within three months. She felt uncomfortable accepting a "political patronage appointment" and that federal policy was presenting additional difficulties for refugees.

Recognition and honours
In 1992, she was awarded the 125th Anniversary of the Confederation of Canada Medal in recognition of her contribution to public service and community. In 1994 she was recognized with a Lifetime Women's Achievement award by the Greek Community of Metropolitan Toronto.

References

External links
 

1932 births
Women members of the House of Commons of Canada
Living people
Members of the House of Commons of Canada from Ontario
Politicians from Saskatoon
Progressive Conservative Party of Canada MPs
Women in Ontario politics